Rocco Benito Commisso (born 25 November 1949) is an Italian-born American billionaire businessman, and the founder, chairman and chief executive officer (CEO) of Mediacom, the fifth largest cable television company in the US. As of 2011, the company is privately owned by Commisso. He previously worked for companies including Cablevision, the Royal Bank of Canada, and Chase Manhattan Bank. Since 2017, Commisso has been the owner and chairman of the New York Cosmos, and since June 2019, the owner of the Italian football club ACF Fiorentina.

Early life and education 

Born in Calabria, Italy, Commisso migrated to the United States at age 12. Commisso attended Mount Saint Michael Academy high school in the Bronx and attended Columbia University on a full undergraduate scholarship where he earned a bachelor's degree in industrial engineering in 1971 from its School of Engineering and Applied Science. He earned an MBA in 1975 from Columbia Business School. He was co-captain of Columbia's varsity football (soccer) team; elected president of the business school student body; and received the business school service award.

Career
Commisso began his business career at Pfizer Inc. After returning to Columbia and graduating from business school, he spent ten years in the financial industry, initially at Chase Manhattan Bank (now J.P. Morgan Chase). In 1978, he began working with cable companies and other entertainment enterprises as a part of Chase's corporate financing department. He later worked at Royal Bank of Canada, where he led the bank's U.S. lending activities to the media and communications sectors. From 1986 to 1995, he was Executive Vice President, chief financial officer, and Director of Cablevision Industries Corporation. During this time, Cablevision Industries grew from the 25th to the 8th largest cable company in the United States, with around 1.3 million customers at the time of its merger with Time Warner.

Commisso has been the chairman and CEO of Mediacom Communications Corporation since he founded the company in 1995 out of his basement. Initially, Mediacom acquired cable systems in underserved smaller American communities. Commisso took Mediacom public in 2000 after which time it grew to become the 8th largest cable operator in the United States with annual revenues of over $1.6 billion. In March 2011, the company then went private and wholly-owned by Commisso. Since that time Mediacom was named the best cable company in the US in 2016 and in 2009 by CableFAX magazine.

Commisso serves on the board of directors of the National Cable & Telecommunications Association, C-SPAN and Cable Television Laboratories, Inc. He is also a member of the Cable TV Pioneers.

Soccer

Columbia University Lions
Commisso played soccer for the Columbia University Lions in the 1967–1970 period. He is a three time All-Ivy League Honouree. In 1967, Commisso was a member of a freshman squad that finished with an undefeated record of 8-0. Commisso served as co-captain of the 1970 team that went 9-4-0 and made Columbia’s first ever appearance in the NCAA men's soccer tournament. Throughout his college soccer career, Commisso was cited numerous times for his skill and leadership culminating in an invitation to try out for the US team for the 1972 Summer Olympics.

Since his time as a student, Commisso has been a contributor to Columbia men's soccer program. From 1978 to 1986, he was Chairman of Friends of Columbia Soccer. Presently, Columbia awards an Annual Men's Soccer Prize in his name. On 12 October 2013, Columbia University named its soccer venue at the school’s Baker Athletics Complex as the Rocco B. Commisso Soccer Stadium. In 2015, he was named a NYC Soccer Gala Honouree. Commisso was inducted into the 2016 Columbia University Athletics Hall of Fame Special Category.

New York Cosmos
In January 2017, Commisso purchased a majority ownership stake in the New York Cosmos soccer club and became the club's new chairman. As the owner, he has moved the team's games to MCU Park in Coney Island. At the time, both the team and its league (the North American Soccer League) were struggling financially, and the move was seen as a sign of support for both. At the time, several of the other bids for the team were to shut down the franchise in order to prevent it from remaining a competitive threat in the league.

ACF Fiorentina
On June 6, 2019, the purchase of ACF Fiorentina by Commisso was formalized giving him recognition for field development. The purchase was finalized on June 24, 2019. It is believed that Commisso bought Fiorentina for somewhere between $150–200 million.

Commisso is planning to grow Fiorentina's brand in the US market. The club's first venture will see it play in the preseason tournament, the International Champions Cup 2019.

In the spring of 2020, Commisso led a GoFundMe campaign, Forza e Cuore, to raise over $1 million (€872,000) for hospitals in Florence during the Coronavirus pandemic.

Recognition
In 2004, on the 250th anniversary of Columbia's founding, the school's newspaper, the Columbia Spectator, listed Commisso among Columbia's 250 greatest undergraduate alumni of all time. The school of business also recognized him as a Select Distinguished Alumni. Commisso is the recipient of the Ernst & Young Entrepreneur of the Year Award for the Southwest Connecticut/New York Hudson Valley region, the Innovator Award for Business Strategy from Cablevision magazine, and the National Italian American Foundation Lifetime Achievement Award. In 2007, he was inducted into the Broadcasting & Cable Hall of Fame. In 2008, he served as Co-Chair of the Cable Show staged in New Orleans. In 2009, Commisso was presented with the Vanguard Award for Distinguished Leadership, the cable industry’s highest honor. In 2010, he was welcomed into the SUNY New Paltz School of Business Hall of Fame and named Business Person of the Year. In June 2011, Commisso was inducted into the Cable Center Hall of Fame. In 2015, he was awarded the Ellis Island Medal of Honour.  In 2018, Commisso was inducted into the National Italian American Sports Hall of Fame.

Personal life
Commisso is married to Catherine, they have two children, and live in Saddle River, New Jersey. As of 2015, Catherine Commisso is head of corporate administration for Mediacom.

References 

1949 births
Living people
People from the Province of Reggio Calabria
Italian emigrants to the United States
Italian football chairmen and investors
New York Cosmos
Italian company founders
Cablevision
Cable television company founders
Columbia Lions men's soccer players
Columbia Business School alumni
Columbia School of Engineering and Applied Science alumni
American billionaires
Association footballers not categorized by position
Association football players not categorized by nationality